Nomad Africa is a Pan-African quarterly issue magazine, published in Johannesburg, South Africa, by 2414 Publishing (Pty) Limited a subsidiary of 2414 Media Group. The prototype magazine of Nomad Africa Project was published in January 2012 and its reception was positive, resulting in an increased demand in Africa as well as internationally, so that distribution for the November 2015 printed edition already exceeded 65,000. Originally borne out of a vision to publish Africa's first pan African Tourism magazine, 2414 Publishing (Pty) Ltd took over the Nomad Africa brand in 2015. 
Since 2015  up until the present moment, 2414 Publishing has grown the brand through its extensive contacts and networks to become a high end retail magazine in Southern Africa  as well as being distributed in selected African countries and in most VIP lounges of international airports, business class sections of selected airlines, Four and Five Star Hotels. 
2414 Publishing (Pty) Ltd aims to broaden its African footprint using its flagship brand Nomad Africa Magazine and digital platforms to become the most authoritative pan African Travel & Tourism magazine on the African market. The company encompasses the Nomad Africa brand, NomadBlog, Nomad TV and Nomad Radio (Tourism FM) as well as  all associated media and digital platforms under its publishing umbrella.

Content and style
Nomad Africa magazine celebrates life on the African continent. The objective of the magazine is to promote positivity around Africa and recreate a good image of Africa in the minds of the people global. The magazine consists of topics related to tourism, travel, culture and heritage. Nomad Africa informs, inspires and breeds a generation of visionaries among our own, through the introduction to and appreciation of, the true worth of the continent of Africa. The magazine brings Africa to the world and the world to Africa.
The magazine's content places special emphasis on the fast growth paths in industry, the myriad investment and developmental opportunities, innovations in commerce and technology, African history, business, tourism, special destinations, culture and arts.

Circulation
The Nomad Africa Magazine in print is circulated across the African Continent with subscription and distribution for free, made available in VIP lounges of major international airports, some airlines, four- and five-star hotels, spas and casinos as well as luxury cruise liners sailing around the coasts.

Partnerships and Collaborations
In August 2017, Nomad Africa partnered with London-based World Travel Awards. World Travel Awards Founder and President, Graham Cooke, announced Nomad Africa as an official media partner for World Travel Awards (WTA) Africa Gala Ceremony which took place in Rwanda's thriving capital, Kigali, at the five star Radisson Blu Hotel & Convention Centre.

Management and Ownership
2414 Publishing (Pty) Ltd is owned by John Oluwatosin Akinribido and Dieter Göttert with Akinribido as the major shareholder. Both shareholders play an active role in the management of the holding company.

NomadRadio and NomadTV
In January 2018, Nomad Africa added a podcast broadcast platform that is designed to educate, inform and entertain. Nomad Online Radio kick started with its flagship show ‘Discover Africa’ hosted by veteran broadcaster David Batzofin - a well-known travel writer, award-winning Blogger and Photographer. NomadRadio strives to highlight current topics as well as destinations that might be off the beaten track focusing on both business and tourism. Discover Africa will redefine online radio in Africa.
NomadTV is the online digital television division of the Nomad Africa project. It regularly features interviews with representatives of government and tourism boards across the continent of Africa and helps showcase their unique offerings and destinations.

References

External links
 Official website
 Project's website
 Official NomadBlog website
 Official NomadTV website
 Official NomadRadio|TourismFM website

2015 establishments in South Africa
Magazines established in 2015
Mass media in Johannesburg
Quarterly magazines
Political magazines published in South Africa
English-language magazines published in South Africa
Tourism magazines